Pseudocoremia lutea is a species of moth in the family Geometridae. It is endemic to New Zealand. It is classified as "At Risk, Naturally Uncommon" by the Department of Conservation.

Taxonomy 
This species was first described by Alfred Philpott in 1914 using specimens collected at Bold Peak, Humboldt Range by C. Fenwick and George Howes in December and January. Philpott named the species Selidosema lutea. George Hudson, using the same name, described and illustrated this species in his 1928 book The Butterflies and Moths of New Zealand. In 1988 John S. Dugdale assigned the species to the genus Pseudocoremia. The holotype specimen is  held at the Museum of New Zealand Te Papa Tongarewa.

Description 
Philpott described the species as follows:

Distribution  
This species is endemic to New Zealand. This species can only be found in the Otago Lakes area.

Biology and host species 
The biology and host species of this moth is unknown.

Conservation status 
This species has been classified under the New Zealand Threat Classification system as being "At Risk, Naturally Uncommon".

References

Boarmiini
Moths of New Zealand
Endemic fauna of New Zealand
Moths described in 1914
Endangered biota of New Zealand
Endemic moths of New Zealand